Grubba may refer to:

 Andrzej Grubba, a Polish table tennis player
 Macho Grubba, a character in Paper Mario: The Thousand-Year Door
 Grubba the Hutt, a Star Wars character
 1058 Grubba, an asteroid